Peletier Plateau is an ice-covered plateau, about 20 nautical miles (37 km) long and 5 nautical miles (9 km) wide, forming the southern part of Queen Elizabeth Range. Named by Advisory Committee on Antarctic Names (US-ACAN) for Rear Admiral Eugene Peletier, CEC, U.S. Navy, Bureau of Yards and Docks, who was of assistance to Rear Admiral George J. Dufek in the preparation of U.S. Navy Operation Deepfreeze II, 1956–57.

Plateaus of Oates Land